The Zombie Horror Picture Show is the first concert film by American musician Rob Zombie, released May 19, 2014 on DVD and Blu-ray.

Track list 

"Teenage Nosferatu Pussy"
"Superbeast"
"Super-Charger Heaven"
"Living Dead Girl"
"We're an American Band"
"More Human than Human"
"Sick Bubblegum"
"Never Gonna Stop (The Red Red Kroovy)"
"Ging Gang Gong De Do Gong De Laga Raga"
"Meet The Creeper"
"Theme For An Angry Red Planet"
"Mars Needs Women"
"House of 1000 Corpses"
"The Lords of Salem"
"Dead City Radio and the New Gods of Supertown"
"Thunder Kiss '65"
"Dragula"

2014 films
Rob Zombie
Concert films
Films directed by Rob Zombie